The discography of Diana Vickers, a British singer-songwriter, consists of two studio albums, one extended play, and six singles. Vickers debuted in 2008 as a contestant on The X Factor, a British television music competition. Her fourth-place finish brought Vickers to the attention of RCA Records, which signed her in 2009.

Vickers released her debut studio album Songs from the Tainted Cherry Tree in May 2010. The album reached number one on the United Kingdom albums chart and the top ten of the Irish Albums Chart. In August 2010, it was certified gold by the British Phonographic Industry (BPI). Two singles were released from the album: "Once" and "The Boy Who Murdered Love", with "Once" peaking at number one in the UK. "My Wicked Heart", a non-album song, followed in late 2010.

In July 2011, Vickers parted ways with RCA Records citing "musical differences" in the direction for the second album as the reason behind the mutual split. In February 2013, it was revealed that Vickers had signed a worldwide record deal with So Recordings. On 9 April 2013, it was confirmed that the lead single to Vickers' second album is titled "Cinderella", with a preview snippet being made available on iTunes. "Cinderella" was released to digital retailers on 21 July 2013 in the UK.

Vickers' second album titled, Music to Make Boys Cry followed on 15 September 2013 in the UK and Ireland along with the title track serving as the album's second single. The album charted at number thirty-seven on the UK Albums Chart and number nine on the UK Indie Chart on 22 September 2013. It also broke into the Top 20 of the Irish Independent Albums Chart peaking at number nineteen.

Albums

Studio albums

Extended plays

Singles

As lead artist

As featured artist

Other charted songs

Music videos

Other appearances
These songs have not appeared on a studio album released by Vickers.

References

External links 
 
 

Discographies of British artists
Pop music discographies